Bronisław Dembowski (2 October 1927 – 16 November 2019) was a Polish Catholic bishop.

Dembowski was born in Poland and was ordained to the priesthood in 1953. He served as the bishop of the Diocese of Włocławek, Poland, from 1992 to 2003.

Notes

1927 births
2019 deaths
Bishops of Kujawy and Włocławek